How We Invented The World is a 2012 Discovery Network technology documentary TV series which premiered on November 6, 2012. It was produced by Nutopia and distributed by Discovery Channel. It was directed by Stephen Warburton, Jonathan Rudd and Sam Miller. It Explores the most iconic inventions and breakthroughs of the modern age. It was hosted by Laurence Fox and narrated in English.

Episodes

Episode one: Mobile Phones 
The mobile phone has connected the modern world, but inventing it took the most beautiful woman in the world, Frankenstein’s creator, the Titanic tragedy and the ultimate stroll down 6th Avenue.

Episode two: Skyscrapers 
The skyscraper – the ultimate symbol of power and wealth. But, incredibly, to invent the skyscraper it took a bird in a cage, a city in flames, a chance question from a college student and the humble horse and wagon.

Episode three: Aeroplanes 
The aeroplane - it’s made our dream of flight a reality, but the moments of genius and invention it took to invent it involved not just birds as inspiration, but bikes, a trip to the Moon and back, a pair of frozen eyeballs and two nervous breakdowns.

Episode four: Cars 
The car - so much more than getting us from A-B, but the eureka moments it took to invent the car we know today included a Scottish veterinarian, an ambitious wife, thousands of slaughtered animals and a terrifying experiment with boiling oil.

Episode five: Guns

References

Further reading 
 
 
 


Discovery Channel original programming